LMS Stanier Class 5 4-6-0 No. 45212 is a preserved British steam locomotive. It was built by Armstrong Whitworth at Newcastle upon Tyne in 1935.

Service history 
It is a LMS Stanier Class 5 4-6-0 locomotive, originally numbered 5212 by the LMS, it had 40000 added to its number under British Railways after nationalisation in 1948. 45212 was one of the last locomotives to be withdrawn from service, surviving until 1968, the last year of steam on British Railways.

Preservation 
In August 1968, Ron Ainsworth purchased 45212 directly from British Railways service for use on the Keighley & Worth Valley Railway, so never had to be restored from scrapyard condition, and is now owned by the Keighley & Worth Valley Railway. Between 2000 and 2011, it was overhauled and operated at the North Yorkshire Moors Railway, but was not able to run trains into Whitby or Battersby as it was not mainline certified.

In 2012 an agreement was reached with Ian Riley for a 10 year period where the locomotive would be overhauled to mainline standards, while spending 3 months of the year at the Keighley & Worth Valley Railway. Following the 2016 completion of an overhaul at Riley's workshop in Bury, the engine is now mainline certified, and is operated by them on the main line, alongside Black 5s 44871 and 45407.

References

External links 
 Railuk database
 Preserved locomotive database

45212
Preserved London, Midland and Scottish Railway steam locomotives
Individual locomotives of Great Britain
Railway locomotives introduced in 1935
Standard gauge steam locomotives of Great Britain